Douglas William Orr (March 25, 1892 – July 29, 1966) was an American architect based in New Haven, Connecticut.

Biography
Douglas Orr was born in Meriden, Connecticut, to Adam and Mary Orr. He was prolific and designed many public and commercial buildings, primarily in the New Haven area.  He was president of the American Institute of Architects from 1947 to 1949.  In 1949, he also helped to renovate the White House. He died in 1966 in Stony Creek, Connecticut.

Orr worked for H. Wales Lines Company before starting the firm Orr & Booth in 1916, partnering with Robert H. S. Booth. The firm received many commissions, including the office and factory of the Connecticut Telephone and Electric Company, but business was interrupted when both partners served in the armed forces on entry of the United States into World War I; Orr served in the army. After receiving his undergraduate degree from Yale University, he opened his own architectural practice in 1919. He completed a master's degree in fine arts at Yale in 1927, where he designed the Taft Memorial Tower and Harkness Memorial Hall.  His portfolio included many other academic projects, among them buildings at Mt. Holyoke and Hollins Colleges and memorial chapels at the Coast Guard and Merchant Marine Academies.  He was a member of the U.S. Commission of Fine Arts from 1955 to 1963 (vice chairman 1955-63), a member of the Commission on the Renovation of the Executive Mansion, the Advisory Commission on Presidential Office Space, and the Smithsonian Art Commission.  Orr was also an academician of the American Architectural Foundation, a fellow of the American Institute of Architects, and a member of the National Academy of Design.

Late in his career, Orr established a partnership with architects William deCossy and Frank Winder; the firm was then called Douglas Orr, deCossy, Winder, and Associates. Orr worked in art deco and colonial revival as well as more modern styles.

Selected works
 World War I memorial flagpole, New Haven Green, 1928
 The Eli (Southern New England Telephone), with R. W. Foote, 1937.  Art deco masterpiece on the National Register. Company headquarters converted to apartments.
 New Haven Lawn Club
 The Farnam Guest House, 616 Prospect Street, New Haven, CT, 1934. Georgian revival built for Henry W. Farnam.
The Church of the Redeemer, New Haven, Connecticut, 1951.
 Laboratory for Surgery, Obstetrics and Gynecology, Yale School of Medicine, 1952
 East Pavilion (Memorial Unit), Yale-New Haven Hospital, 1953
 Columbia Gas Transmission Building, Charleston, West Virginia, 1955
 J. W. Gibbs Labs, Yale University, with Paul Schweikher, 1955.  Glass, steel and Tennessee marble.
 Willoughby Wallace Memorial Library, Stony Creek, Connecticut, 1958. Faced with Stony Creek granite.
 Robert A. Taft Memorial and Carillon, Washington, DC, 1959
 One Church Street (First New Haven National Bank, now New Alliance Bank), New Haven,	1961. Interior lobbies faced with Stony Creek granite.
 Laboratory of Epidemiology and Public Health (with Philip C. Johnson), Yale University, 1964 
 Lippard Laboratory of Clinical Investigation, Yale-New Haven Hospital, 1965
 Community Services Building (now the Knights of Columbus Museum),  New Haven, 1965.

References

1892 births
1966 deaths
20th-century American architects
Architects from Connecticut
Architects from New Haven, Connecticut
Fellows of the American Institute of Architects
Presidents of the American Institute of Architects
Yale College alumni
People from Meriden, Connecticut
National Academy of Design members